Julian Simpson is a London-based British writer and director working in film, television and audio. He is best known for his radio plays, most of which take place within his "Pleasant Green Universe" with loose connections to each other, including The Lovecraft Investigations series, based on the works of H.P. Lovecraft.

Julian also wrote and directed the play Kokomo for BBC Radio 4.

.

Pleasant Green Universe
The Pleasant Green Universe is a series of loosely connected radio plays that focus upon strange occurrences. As of 2021 it is made up of seven dramas, beginning with Fragments.

Fragments
Fragments was first aired on BBC Radio 4 on 31 August 2007 as part of its Friday Drama series. The play is set in the village of Pleasant Green, which has become increasingly gentrified and exclusive. One of the villagers,  Grant (John Carlisle), has placed devices throughout the town that allow him to record and transmit any sound. Teenager Kelly Sharp becomes intrigued by him and ultimately agrees to become part of a plan to disrupt the gentrification by taking credit for murdering him. In truth Grant actually committed suicide and at the last minute tries to make a recording absolving her, only for Kelly to search for and discover the tape.

The cast featured John Carlisle, Lesley Sharp, Philip Glenister, Sarah Smart, Daniel Ryan, Sean Gallagher, Nicola Walker, and Will Keen.

The Listener
The Listener first aired on BBC Radio 4 on 8 January 2010 as part of its Friday Drama series. The story's plot centres upon a police agent, Mark, who is left without any memories of his past but fears that he may actually be a brainwashed terrorist. As the story progresses he discovers that neither personality is legitimate and that he's an undercover agent who habitually has his mind wiped and reprogrammed to assist the government in solving cases.

The cast featured Mark Bazeley, Indira Varma, Nicola Walker, Mark Lewis Jones, Jimmy Akingbola, and Paul Panting.

Bad Memories
Bad Memories aired on BBC Radio 4 on 7 January 2011 and received the Best Use of Sound in an Audio Drama Award at the 2012 BBC Audio Drama Awards. The story involves the mysterious disappearance of the Blake family around 2004 and the discovery of their bodies in the modern day. Forensic tests show that they died in 1926 and were found with audio files. Attempts to retrieve the recordings reveal that the family and a visitor was spirited away by Mary Marston, a coma patient believed to have murdered her family.

The cast featured Nicola Walker, Rupert Graves, Steven Mackintosh, Jana Carpenter, Anthony Calf, Imogen McCurdy, Oscar Richardson, Rohan Nijhawan, and Ted Powell.

Fugue State
Fugue State was broadcast on 29 October 2015 on BBC Radio 4. The story starts with attempts to extract the memories of a government agent who had gone to Pleasant Green to investigate a new numbers station, only to end up in a fugue state. As the story progresses it is revealed that the station was an attempt by otherworldly beings to communicate, only for the communication to be too much for the human brain and consciousness to comprehend. Ultimately the agent, as well as some of the medical workers trying to extract his memories, evolve to a new state of being. This story introduces the character of Johnson, who also appears in the series Mythos.

Fugue State was shortlisted for and won the 2016 Tinniswood Award. The cast featured Nicola Walker, Steven Mackintosh, Tim McInnerny, Ferdinand Kingsley, Phoebe Fox, and Ben Crowe.

Mythos
Mythos is a drama series made up of three episodes, the latter two of which were titled "Glamis" and "Albion". The series revolves around upon a secretive government agency that investigates supernatural and otherworldly threats, real or perceived, to the world. One of the people working for the agency is Marie Lairre, the ghost of a nun that used to haunt Borley Rectory. She reports to Johnson, the government agent from Fugue State. The first episode features her looking for a spell book in a remote village, while the second has her exploring a secret door in a Scottish castle and taking on a new partner.

The first episode aired on 5 April 2017 on BBC Radio 4 and the second and third episodes aired on the same channel on 25 and 26 April 2018, respectively. The cast for the series included Nicola Walker, Tim McInnerny, Jonathan Bailey, Steven Mackintosh, David Calder, Emma Fielding, Hugh Ross, Phoebe Fox, Jana Carpenter, David Holt,Tracy-Ann Oberman, and David Collings.

The Lovecraft Investigations

The Lovecraft Investigations, also known as Mystery Machine, is a podcast made up of three series, each of which is loosely based on stories by H. P. Lovecraft. The first series, "The Case of Charles Dexter Ward", began airing in January 2019 on BBC Radio 4 and ran for ten episodes. The second series was based on the novella The Whisperer in Darkness and ran nine episodes with two bonus episodes/teases beginning in November 2019. The third and final series, "The Shadow Over Innsmouth", ran for eight episodes with three bonus episodes in December 2020.

Critical reception for The Lovecraft Investigations has been positive. The Verge called the first series "like Serial mixed with True Detective" and it also received praise from The Spectator.

Who is Aldrich Kemp? 
This five-part drama started airing on Radio 4 on the 18th of February 2022. The cast again includes Phoebe Fox, Nicola Walker, Jana Carpenter, and Tim McInnerny. The story centers upon attempts by Fox's character Clara Page to determine who and where is the titular Aldrich Kemp.

Selected filmography

Film 

 1999: The Criminal (director / writer)

Television 

2001: Cutting Edge: "I Confess" (director)
2004: Murder Prevention (director: episodes 3 and 4)
2005: In Divine Proportion (screenplay)
2005: The Inspector Lynley Mysteries: "Word of God" (director)
2005: Spooks (director: series 4, episodes 9 and 10)
2006: Spooks (director: series 5, episodes 3 and 8; writer: episode 8)
2008: Final Curtain (director)
2007: Superstorm
2008: Hotel Babylon (director: series 3, episodes 1, 2, and 3)
2009: Hustle (director: series 5, episodes 3 and 4)
2010: Dead Man Talking (director / writer)
2011: Doctor Who (director: episodes "The Almost People" and "The Rebel Flesh")
2014: 24: Live Another Day (2nd unit director)
2008–2015: New Tricks (director: 17 episodes)

Selected awards

References

External links
 
 Photography website
 Cartoon Gravity
 

British film directors
Living people
Year of birth missing (living people)